Martha Hilda González Calderón (born 13 August 1965) is a Mexican lawyer and politician from the Institutional Revolutionary Party. She currently serves as a federal deputy of the LXIII Legislature of the Mexican Congress representing the XXXIV Federal Electoral District of the State of Mexico.

Early life and education
González Calderón received her law degree from the Universidad Autónoma del Estado de México in 1987 and immediately became the Director of Social Promotion in Toluca; after two years, she transitioned into a citizen attention position in Toluca's second district. In 1990, she became an alternate local deputy to the LI Legislature of the Congress of the State of Mexico, while she served as a women's leader and municipal councilor in the local PRI and pursued her master's degree in Political Sociology from the School for Advanced Studies in the Social Sciences in Paris. Two years after graduating with her master's in 1993, she received her doctorate degree in the same discipline from the Paris Dauphine University. She went on to teach French and political analysis.

Career

Return to Mexico
In the late 1990s, González Calderón's Mexican political career resumed. She became a deputy attorney for the Toluca Valley in 1999 and left that position to spend a year as the environmental secretary of the State of Mexico, between 2001 and 2002. A year later, voters sent her to the LV Legislature of the Congress of the State of Mexico, where she presided over the Political Coordination Board and the Commission for the Prosecution and Administration of Justice. During this time, from 2004 to 2007, she served on the board of the State of Mexico Institute of Public Administration, A.C.

After her three-year term as a state deputy, González went to the federal Chamber of Deputies for the LX Legislature of the Mexican Congress, being vice president of its board of directors and serving on commissions including Metropolitan Development, National Defense, Environment and Natural Resources, Special on Femicides, and Special on Non-Discrimination.

With her first term in San Lázaro over, González Calderón briefly returned to the state government with a brief stint as the secretary of tourism, a position she left after just one year in order to become the PRI's secretary general in the State of Mexico. In 2012, she was tapped as president of the PRI in Toluca.

Municipal presidency
In 2012, voters elected González Calderón from a coalition including the PRI, PVEM and Nueva Alianza to become the new municipal president of Toluca beginning on 1 January 2013; she received just over half the vote. During her tenure, Toluca was awarded by the Mexican Competitiveness Institute for leading the nation in budget transparency in 2014. Social media users criticized her in 2013 for allegedly ordering a culling of stray dogs in the city.

Back to San Lázaro
In January 2015, González Calderón asked for approval to permanently step aside as mayor of Toluca in order to run for federal deputy. She won the seat for the 34th district, one of several including Toluca, and sits on the Competitiveness, Public Education and Educational Services, and Government Commissions.

References

External links

1965 births
Living people
Politicians from the State of Mexico
Women members of the Chamber of Deputies (Mexico)
20th-century Mexican lawyers
Members of the Chamber of Deputies (Mexico) for the State of Mexico
Institutional Revolutionary Party politicians
Mexican women lawyers
Members of the Congress of the State of Mexico
Paris Dauphine University alumni
21st-century Mexican politicians
21st-century Mexican women politicians
Deputies of the LXIII Legislature of Mexico